The 2018 FA Community Shield (also known as The FA Community Shield supported by McDonald's for sponsorship reasons) was the 96th FA Community Shield, an annual football match played between the title holders of the Premier League and FA Cup. It was contested by Manchester City, champions of the 2017–18 Premier League, and Chelsea, the winners of the 2017–18 FA Cup, at Wembley Stadium in London on 5 August 2018. Manchester City won 2–0, with both goals scored by Sergio Agüero, who was named man of the match for his performance.

Background 
This was Maurizio Sarri's first competitive match in charge of Chelsea; meanwhile, it was Pep Guardiola's second cup final as the manager of Manchester City, following their victory over Arsenal in the 2018 EFL Cup Final.

Manchester City qualified for the competition by winning the 2017–18 Premier League with a record 100 points, the first of any English club in the top-flight since the introduction of the three points for a win rule.

Chelsea were looking to win the Community Shield for the first time since 2009, when they beat Manchester United 4–1 on penalties. They had failed to win any of their last four appearances in the competition. Manchester City had won their last two matches at Wembley, both in 2017–18 – beating Arsenal 3–0 in the EFL Cup Final in February and Tottenham Hotspur 3–1 in the league in April; however, they had not won three consecutive matches at Wembley since March 1970.

The two sides faced each other in the Community Shield once previously, in 2012, a match won 3–2 by Manchester City.

Match

Details

References 

FA Community Shield
Community Shield
Charity Shield 2018
Charity Shield 2018
Community Shield
Events at Wembley Stadium
Community Shield